Biafra, officially the Republic of Biafra, was a partially recognised secessionist state in West Africa that declared independence from Nigeria and existed from 1967 until 1970. Its territory consisted of the predominantly Igbo-populated Eastern Region of Nigeria. Biafra was established on 30 May 1967 by Igbo military officer and Eastern Region governor C. Odumegwu Ojukwu under his presidency, following a series of ethnic tensions and military coups after Nigerian independence in 1960 that culminated in the 1966 massacres of Igbo people and other ethnic groups living in northern Nigeria. The military of Nigeria proceeded to invade Biafra shortly after its secession, resulting in the start of the Nigerian Civil War.

Biafra was formally recognised by Gabon, Haiti, Ivory Coast, Tanzania, and Zambia. Other nations, which did not officially recognise Biafra, but provided diplomatic or military support to Biafra, included France, Spain, Portugal, Norway, Israel, Rhodesia, South Africa, and Vatican City. Biafra received aid from non-state actors, including Joint Church Aid, foreign mercenaries, Holy Ghost Fathers of Ireland, and under their direction Caritas Internationalis, and U.S. Catholic Relief Services.  Médecins Sans Frontières also originated in response to the suffering. 

Although the government of the United States under the presidency of Lyndon B. Johnson maintained an official neutral stance during the war, there was strong public support for Biafra in the United States. The American Committee to Keep Biafra Alive was founded by American activists to spread pro-Biafran propaganda. U.S. president Richard Nixon was sympathetic to Biafra, and he won his 1968 election after he accused Nigeria of committing a genocide against Biafrans and called for the United States to intervene in the war to support Biafra, but he was ultimately unsuccessful in his efforts to aid Biafra due to the demands of the Vietnam War.

After two-and-a-half years of war, during which almost two million Biafran civilians (three-quarters of them small children) died from starvation caused by the total blockade of the region by the Nigerian government, Biafran forces under Nigeria's motto of "No-victor, No-vanquished" surrendered to the Nigerian Federal Military Government (FMG). The surrender was facilitated by the Biafran Vice President and Chief of General Staff, Major General Philip Effiong, who assumed leadership of the Republic of Biafra after the original President, Colonel Chukwuemeka Odumegwu Ojukwu, fled to Ivory Coast. After the surrender of Biafrans, some Igbos who had fled the conflict returned to their properties but were unable to claim them back from new occupants. This became law in the Abandoned Properties Act (28 September 1979). It was purported that at the start of the civil war, Igbos withdrew their funds from Nigerian banks and converted it to the Biafran currency. After the war, bank accounts owned by Biafrans were seized and a Nigerian panel resolved to give every Igbo person an account with only 20 pounds. Federal projects in Biafra were also greatly reduced compared to other parts of Nigeria. In an Intersociety study it was found that Nigerian security forces also extorted approximately $100 million per year from illegal roadblocks and other methods from Igboland – a cultural sub-region of Biafra in what is now southern Nigeria, causing the Igbo citizenry to trust the Nigerian security forces even less than before.

Igbo nationalism emerged immediately after the end of the civil war and it became more militant since the 1990s, calling for the revival of Biafra. Various Biafran secessionist groups have emerged such as the Indigenous People of Biafra, the Movement for the Actualization of the Sovereign State of Biafra, and the Biafra Zionist Front.

History and etymology

Early modern maps of Africa from the 15th to the 19th centuries, drawn from accounts written by explorers and travellers, show references to Biafar, Biafara, Biafra, and Biafares. According to the maps, the European travellers used the word Biafara to describe the region of today's West Cameroon, including an area around today's Equatorial Guinea. The German publisher Johann Heinrich Zedler, in his encyclopedia of 1731, published the exact geographical location of the capital of Biafara, namely alongside the river Rio dos Camaroes in today's Cameroon, underneath 6 degrees 10 min latitude. The words Biafara and Biafares also appear on maps from the 18th century in the area around Senegal and Gambia.

In his personal writings from his travels, a Rev. Charles W. Thomas defined the locations of islands in the Bight of Biafra as "between the parallels of longitude 5° and 9° East and latitude 4° North and 2° South".

Events leading to war

In 1960, Nigeria became independent of the United Kingdom. As with many other new African states, the borders of the country did not reflect earlier ethnic, cultural, religious, or political boundaries. Thus, the northern region of the country has a Muslim majority, being primarily made up of territory of the indigenous Sokoto Caliphate. The southern population is predominantly Christian, being primarily made up of territory of the indigenous Yoruba and Igbo states in the west and east respectively. Following independence, Nigeria was demarcated primarily along ethnic lines: Hausa and Fulani majority in the north, Yoruba majority in the West, and Igbo majority in the East.

Ethnic tension had simmered in Nigeria during discussions of independence, but in the mid-twentieth century, ethnic and religious riots began to occur. In 1945 an ethnic riot flared up in Jos in which Hausa-Fulani people targeted Igbo people and left many dead and wounded. Police and Army units from Kaduna had to be brought in to restore order. A newspaper article describes the event:

At Jos in 1945, a sudden and savage attack by Northerners took the Easterners completely by surprise, and before the situation could be brought under control, the bodies of Eastern women, men, and children littered the streets and their property worth thousands of pounds reduced to shambles

Three hundred Igbo people were murdered in the Jos riots. In 1953 a similar riot occurred in Kano. A decade later in 1964 and during the Western political crisis divided the Western Region as Ladoke Akintola clashed with Obafemi Awolowo. Widespread reports of fraud tarnished the election's legitimacy. Westerners especially resented the political domination of the Northern People's Congress, many of whose candidates ran unopposed in the election. Violence spread throughout the country and some began to flee the North and West, some to Dahomey. The apparent domination of the political system by the North, and the chaos breaking out across the country, motivated elements within the military to consider decisive action. The federal government, dominated by Northern Nigeria, allowed the crisis to unfold with the intention of declaring a state of emergency and placing the Western Region under martial law. This administration of the Nigerian federal government was widely perceived to be corrupt. In January 1966, the situation reached a breaking point. A military coup occurred during which a mixed but predominantly Igbo group of army officers assassinated 30 political leaders, including Nigeria's Prime Minister, Sir Abubakar Tafawa Balewa, and the Northern premier, Sir Ahmadu Bello. The four most senior officers of Northern origin were also killed. Nnamdi Azikiwe, the President, of Igbo extraction, and the favoured Western Region politician Obafemi Awolowo were not killed. The commander of the army, General Aguiyi Ironsi seized power to maintain order.

In July 1966, northern officers and army units staged a counter-coup, killing General Aguiyi Ironsi and several southern officers. The predominantly Muslim officers named a General from a small ethnic group (the Angas) in central Nigeria, General Yakubu "Jack" Gowon, as the head of the Federal Military Government (FMG). The two coups deepened Nigeria's ethnic tensions. In September 1966, approximately 30,000 Igbo civilians were killed in the north, and some Northerners were killed in backlashes in eastern cities.

In January 1967, the military leaders Yakubu "Jack" Gowon, Chukwuemeka Ojukwu and senior police officials of each region met in Aburi, Ghana and agreed on a less centralised union of regions. The Northerners were at odds with this agreement that was known as the Aburi Accords; Obafemi Awolowo, the leader of the Western Region warned that if the Eastern Region seceded, the Western Region would also, which persuaded the northerners.

After returning to Nigeria, the federal government reneged on the agreement and unilaterally declared the creation of several new states including some that gerrymandered the Igbos in Biafra. On 26 May the Ojukwu decreed to secede from Nigeria; after consultations with community leaders from across the Eastern Region. Four days later, Ojukwu unilaterally declared the independence of the Republic of Biafra, citing the Igbos killed in the post-coup violence as reasons for the declaration of independence. It is believed this was one of the major factors that sparked the war. The large amount of oil in the region also created conflict, as oil was already becoming a major component of the Nigerian economy. Biafra was ill-equipped for war, with fewer army personnel and less equipment than the Nigerian military, but had advantages over the Nigerian state as they were fighting in their homeland and had the support of most Biafrans.

The FMG attacked Biafra on 6 July 1967. Nigeria's initial efforts were unsuccessful; the Biafrans successfully launched their own offensive, and expansion efforts; occupying areas in the mid-Western Region in August 1967. However, with the support of British, American and Russian governments, Nigeria turned the tide of the war. By October 1967, the FMG had regained the land after intense fighting. In September 1968, the federal army planned what Gowon described as the "final offensive". Initially, the final offensive was neutralised by Biafran troops. In the latter stages, a Southern FMG offensive managed to break through the fierce resistance.

Geography

Its coast was on the Gulf of Guinea of the South Atlantic Ocean in the south.

The country's northeast bordered the Benue Hills and mountains that lead to Cameroon. Three major rivers flow from Biafra into the Gulf of Guinea: the Imo River, the Cross River and the Niger River.

The territory of the Republic of Biafra is covered nowadays by the reorganised Nigerian states of Akwa Ibom, Rivers, Cross River, Bayelsa, Ebonyi, Enugu, Anambra, Imo, Abia. While the Igbo people of the current Nigerian state of Delta were not included in Biafra as per Ojukwu's decree founding Biafra, Igbo nationalists amongst the few Igbos in Delta did fight on the Biafran side.

Languages
The languages of Biafra were Igbo, Anaang, Efik, Ibibio, Ogoni, and Ijaw, among others. However, English was used as the national language.

Politics
The Republic of Biafra was a unitary republic administered under emergency measures. It consisted of an executive branch, in the form of Chukwuemeka Odumegwu Ojukwu, and a judicial branch in the form of the Ministry of Justice. Its legal system was based on the English Common Law.

Economy
An early institution created by the Biafran government was the Bank of Biafra, accomplished under "Decree No. 3 of 1967". The bank carried out all central banking functions including the administration of foreign exchange and the management of the public debt of the Republic. The bank was administered by a governor and four directors; the first governor, who signed on bank notes, was Sylvester Ugoh. A second decree, "Decree No. 4 of 1967", modified the Banking Act of the Federal Republic of Nigeria for the Republic of Biafra.

The bank was first located in Enugu, but due to the ongoing war, it was relocated several times.
Biafra attempted to finance the war through foreign exchange. After Nigeria announced its currency would no longer be legal tender (to make way for a new currency), this effort increased. After the announcement, tons of Nigerian bank notes were transported in an effort to acquire foreign exchange. The currency of Biafra had been the Nigerian pound until the Bank of Biafra started printing out its own notes, the Biafran pound. The new currency went public on 28 January 1968, and the Nigerian pound was not accepted as an exchange unit. The first issue of the bank notes included only 5 shillings notes and 1 pound notes. The Bank of Nigeria exchanged only 30 pounds for an individual and 300 pounds for enterprises in the second half of 1968.

In 1969 new notes were introduced: £10, £5, £1, 10/- and 5/-.

It is estimated that a total of £115–140 million Biafran pounds were in circulation by the end of the conflict, with a population of about 14 million, approximately £10 per person.

Military

At the beginning of the war Biafra had 3,000 soldiers, but at the end of the war, the soldiers totalled 30,000. There was no official support for the Biafran Army by any other nation throughout the war, although arms were clandestinely acquired. Because of the lack of official support, the Biafrans manufactured many of their weapons locally. Europeans served in the Biafran cause; German-born Rolf Steiner was a lieutenant colonel assigned to the 4th Commando Brigade and Welshman Taffy Williams served as a Major until the very end of the conflict. A special guerrilla unit, the Biafran Organization of Freedom Fighters, was established, designed to emulate the insurrectionist guerrilla forces of the Viet Cong in the American – Vietnamese War, targeting Nigerian Federal Army supply lines and forcing them to shift forces to internal security efforts.

The Biafrans managed to set up a small yet effective air force. The BAF commander was Polish World War II ace Jan Zumbach. Early inventory included four World War II American bombers: two B-25 Mitchells, two B-26 Invaders (Douglas A-26) (one piloted by Zumbach), a converted Douglas DC-3 and one British de Havilland Dove. In 1968 the Swedish pilot Carl Gustaf von Rosen suggested the MiniCOIN project to General Ojukwu. By early 1969, Biafra had assembled five MFI-9Bs in neighbouring Gabon, calling them the "Biafra Babies". They were painted in green camouflage and armed with two Matra Type 122 rocket pods, each being able to carry six 68 mm SNEB anti-armour rockets under each wing and had Swedish WW2 reflex sights from old FFVS J 22s. The six aeroplanes were flown by three Swedish pilots and three Biafran pilots. In September 1969, Biafra acquired four ex-French North American T-6 Texans (T-6G), which were flown to Biafra the following month, with another aircraft lost on the ferry flight. These aircraft flew missions until January 1970 and were flown by Portuguese ex-military pilots.

Biafra also had a small improvised navy, but it never gained the success that their air force did. It was headquartered in Kidney Island, Port Harcourt, and commanded by Winifred Anuku. The Biafran Navy was made up of captured craft, converted tugs, and armour-reinforced civilian vessels armed with machine guns or captured 6-pounder guns. It mainly operated in the Niger River delta and along the Niger River.

Legacy

The international humanitarian organisation Médecins Sans Frontières originated in response to the suffering in Biafra. During the crisis, French medical volunteers, in addition to Biafran health workers and hospitals, were subjected to attacks by the Nigerian army and witnessed civilians being murdered and starved by the blockading forces. French doctor Bernard Kouchner also witnessed these events, particularly the huge number of starving children, and, when he returned to France, he publicly criticised the Nigerian government and the Red Cross for their seemingly complicit behaviour. With the help of other French doctors, Kouchner put Biafra in the media spotlight and called for an international response to the situation. These doctors, led by Kouchner, concluded that a new aid organisation was needed that would ignore political/religious boundaries and prioritise the welfare of victims.

In their study Smallpox and its Eradication, Fenner and colleagues describe how vaccine supply shortages during the Biafra smallpox campaign led to the development of the focal vaccination technique, later adopted worldwide by the World Health Organization of the United Nations, which led to the early and cost-effective interruption of smallpox transmission in West Africa and elsewhere.

In 2010, researchers from Karolinska Institutet in Sweden and University of Nigeria at Nsukka showed that Igbos born in Biafra during the years of the famine were of higher risk of suffering from obesity, hypertension and impaired glucose metabolism compared to controls born a short period after the famine had ended in the early 1970s. The findings are in line with the developmental origin of health and disease hypothesis suggesting that malnutrition in early life is a predisposing factor for cardiovascular diseases and diabetes later in life.

A 2017 paper found that Biafran "women exposed to the war in their growing years exhibit reduced adult stature, increased likelihood of being overweight, earlier age at first birth, and lower educational attainment. Exposure to a primary education program mitigates impacts of war exposure on education. War-exposed men marry later and have fewer children. War exposure of mothers (but not fathers) has adverse impacts on child growth, survival, and education. Impacts vary with age of exposure. For mother and child health, the largest impacts stem from adolescent exposure."

Post-war events and Biafran nationalism 

The Movement for the Actualization of the Sovereign State of Biafra (MASSOB) emerged in 1999 as a nonviolent Biafran nationalist group, associated with Igbo nationalism. The group enacted a "re-launch" of Biafra in Aba, the commercial centre of Abia State and a major commercial centre on Igbo land. MASSOB says it is a peaceful group and advertises a 25-stage plan to achieve its goal peacefully. It has two arms of government, the Biafra Government in Exile and the Biafra Shadow Government. MASSOB accuses Nigeria of marginalising Biafran people. Since August 1999, protests have erupted in cities across Nigeria's south-east. Though peaceful, the protesters have been routinely attacked by the Nigerian police and army, with large numbers of people reportedly killed. Many others have been injured and/or arrested.

On 29 May 2000, the Lagos Guardian newspaper reported that the now ex-president Olusegun Obasanjo commuted to retirement the dismissal of all military persons, soldiers and officers, who fought for the breakaway Republic of Biafra during Nigeria's 1967–1970 civil war. In a national broadcast, he said the decision was based on the belief that "justice must at all times be tempered with mercy".

In July 2006 the Center for World Indigenous Studies reported that government-sanctioned killings were taking place in the southeastern city of Onitsha, because of a shoot-to-kill policy directed toward Biafrans, particularly members of the MASSOB.

The Nigerian federal government accuses MASSOB of violence; MASSOB's leader, Ralph Uwazuruike, was arrested in 2005 and was detained on treason charges. He has since been released and has been rearrested and released more than five times. In 2009, MASSOB leader Chief Uwazuruike launched an unrecognised "Biafran International Passport" and also launched a Biafra Plate Number in 2016 in response to persistent demand by some Biafran sympathizers in the diaspora and at home. On 16 June 2012, a Supreme Council of Elders of the Indigenous People of Biafra, another pro-Biafra organisation, was formed. The body is made up of some prominent persons in the Biafra region. They sued the Federal Republic of Nigeria for the right to self-determination. Debe Odumegwu Ojukwu, the eldest son of ex-President / General Ojukwu and a Lagos state-based lawyer was the lead counsel that championed the case.

MASSOB leader Chief Ralph Uwazuruike established Radio Biafra in the United Kingdom in 2009, with Nnamdi Kanu as his radio director; later Kanu was said to have been dismissed from MASSOB because of accusations of supporting violence. The Nigerian Government, through its broadcasting regulators, the Broadcasting Organisation of Nigerian and Nigerian Communications Commission, has sought to clamp down on Radio Biafra with limited success. On 17 November 2015, the Abia state police command seized an Indigenous People of Biafra radio transmitter in Umuahia. On 23 December 2015, Kanu was detained and charged with charges that amounted to treason against the Nigerian state. He was released on bail on 24 April 2017 after spending more than 19 months without trial of his treason charges. Self-determination is not a crime in Nigerian law.

According to the South-East Based Coalition of Human Rights Organisations, security forces under the directive of the federal government have killed 80 members of the Indigenous People of Biafra and their supporters between 30 August 2015 and 9 February 2016 in a renewed clampdown on the campaign. A report by Amnesty International between August 2015 and August 2016, at least 150 pro-Biafran activists overall were killed by Nigerian security forces, with 60 people shot in a period of two days in connection with events marking Biafran Remembrance Day. The Nigerian military killed at least 17 unarmed Biafrans in the city of Onitsha prior to a march on 30 May 2016 commemorating the 49th anniversary of Biafra's 1967 declaration of independence.

Another group is the Biafra Nations League, formerly known as Biafra Nations Youth League, which has its operational base in Bakassi Peninsula. The group is led by Princewill Chimezie Richard, alias Prince Obuka, and Ebuta Akor Takon (not to be mistaken by its former Deputy, Ebuta Ogar Takon). The group also has a Chief of Staff and operational commander who are both natives of the Bakassi. BNL have recorded a series of security clamp downs, especially in Bakassi where soldiers of ‘Operations Delta Safe’ apprehended the National Leader, Princewill, in the Ikang-Cameroon border area on 9 November 2016. During an attempt to mobilise a protest in support of Kanu's release, he was again re-arrested by the Nigeria Police Force in the same area on 16 January 2018 along with 20 of their supporters. Many media outlets reported that BnL is linked to the Southern Cameroons separatists; although the group confirms this, they denied involvement in violent activities in the Cameroon. The Deputy Leader, Ebuta Akor Takon is an Ejagham native, a tribe in Nigeria and also in significant number in Cameroon. BnL, which operates more in the Gulf of Guinea, has links with Dokubo Asari, a former militant leader. About 100 members of the group were reportedly arrested in Bayelsa during a meeting with Dokubo on 18 August 2019.

The Incorporated Trustees of Bilie Human Rights Initiative, representing the Indigenous People of Biafra, have filed a lawsuit against the Federal Government of Nigeria and Attorney General of the Federation, seeking the actualisation of the sovereign state of Biafra by legal means. The Federal High Court, Abuja has fixed 25 February 2019 for hearing the suit.

On 31 July 2020, the Movement for the Actualization of the Sovereign State of Biafra/Biafra Independence Movement (BIM-MASSOB) joined the Unrepresented Nations and Peoples Organization (UNPO).

In popular culture
 The song "Roland the Headless Thompson Gunner" (1978) by American musician Warren Zevon is about a Norwegian mercenary fighting in Africa, and it mentions Biafra as one of the locations he travels to.
 The novel The Dogs of War (1974) by British author Frederick Forsyth is based on his experiences working as a journalist in Biafra during the Nigerian Civil War.
 American musician Jello Biafra derived his stage name from the country of Biafra (as well as the Jell-O brand name).

See also
 Insurgency in Southeastern Nigeria
 Ambazonia
 Half of a Yellow Sun by Chimamanda Ngozi Adichie
 Pakistanization

Notes

References

Further reading
  Daly, Samuel Fury Childs.  A History of the Republic of Biafra: Law, Crime, and the Nigerian Civil War, (Cambridge  University Press, 2020) online review
 Hersh, Seymour M. The Price of Power, Kissinger in the Nixon White House, pages 141–146

External links 

  

 
1967 establishments in Nigeria
1970 disestablishments in Nigeria
Former territorial entities in Africa
Former countries in Africa
Former republics
Former unrecognized countries
History of Igboland
History of Nigeria
History of West Africa
Library of Congress Africa Collection related
Nigerian Civil War
Separatism in Nigeria
States and territories disestablished in 1970
States and territories established in 1967
Members of the Unrepresented Nations and Peoples Organization